"Don't You Worry Child" is the sixth single released by Swedish house music supergroup Swedish House Mafia. It is the last single from their second compilation album, Until Now, featuring vocals from Swedish singer John Martin. In the United States, it is the act's second number-one single on Billboard's Dance/Mix Show Airplay chart, following "Save the World". It is the group's biggest hit single to date, as well as the final single released before their disbandment in early 2013. It was released to widespread acclaim and received a Grammy nomination for Best Dance Recording in the 2013 Grammy Awards, as did its predecessor, "Save the World", the previous year. The song is written in the key of B minor.

History 
In May 2010, songwriters Martin and Michel Zitron were in the latter's studio in Stockholm writing material, both recalling their lives when Zitron started opening up his upbringing in a broken home in Stockholm, mentioning the divorce between his parents. The song's chorus was taken verbatim from Zitron's father, while the pre-chorus derives from the songwriters' discovery of young love, inspiring the lyrics "Upon a hill across the blue lake/ That’s where I had my first heartbreak." Martin and Zitron wound up finishing the song later in the month and recorded a demo of the complete writing product. The song was originally meant to launch their own "electro-pop indie duo", however Zitron would later send the demo to Swedish House Mafia group member Sebastian Ingrosso alongside a few other demos in December 2010. Ingrosso would later contact the songwriters to help work on what would later become "Save the World", which was released over a year prior to "Don't You Worry Child".

The following year in January, while in a Los Angeles music studio with fellow supergroup members Axwell and Steve Angello, Ingrosso phoned Zitron and Martin to "send [him] those three songs that [Zitron] played to [him] in the studio". Ingrosso called back Zitron after receiving the files to tell Zitron that Axwell was "lying on the fucking couch, almost crying" after listening to "Don't You Worry Child", before requesting to have the song for themselves. The supergroup then started to become embellished by a long production process that "revealed personal tensions" as depicted in their 2014 documentary Leave the World Behind.

The song was announced during the Swedish House Mafia's tour of Australia while they played at Future Music Festival 2012. They say it was made from the inspiration they took from the beauty of Australia. The title "Don't You Worry Child" was mentioned a few times, with hints from the group members themselves on their Twitter pages. When it was announced that the tour the Swedish House Mafia was about to set on would be their last, a farewell single was also announced – "Don't You Worry Child" being that single. The song had its live debut at the Swedish House Mafia's Milton Keynes Bowl concert and its radio debut on Pete Tong's BBC Radio 1 show on 10 August 2012.

The song was included on their tour One Last Tour, which ended in Miami where they parted ways for five years.

Chart and sales performance
In the United Kingdom, "Don't You Worry Child" made its debut at number one with first week sales of 135,000 copies. It sold 632,000 copies in the United Kingdom in 2012, the 13th best-selling single of that year.

In the United States, the song became Swedish House Mafia's biggest hit, peaking at number 6 on the Billboard Hot 100, making it their first and only top ten single. The song has sold over 3 million copies in the United States as of March 2014, and over 5.5 million copies worldwide.

Music video
A music video for the song was released on 14 September 2012, filmed on location at the group's final British performance on 14 July 2012 at the National Bowl in Milton Keynes. , the music video has over 880 million views on YouTube.

Track listing

Remixes

Notable covers
 The Belgian Flemish boyband 3M8S released a cover that charted on the Belgian Ultratop Singles Chart.

In popular culture
The track has been used during various television programmes around the world. It was featured as one of the opening tracks during the Grand Final of the Eurovision Song Contest 2016 in Stockholm, Sweden.  It was performed by a group of children in the British soap opera Emmerdale at the funeral of the character Gemma Andrews. The song is playable in the video games Just Dance 2014 and Just Dance 2015.

Charts

Weekly charts

Year-end charts

Decade-end charts

Certifications

Release history

See also
 List of best-selling singles in Australia
 List of number-one dance singles of 2012 (U.S.)

References 

2012 singles
Swedish House Mafia songs
John Martin (singer) songs
Number-one singles in Australia
Number-one singles in Scotland
Number-one singles in Sweden
UK Singles Chart number-one singles
Songs written by Sebastian Ingrosso
Songs written by Axwell
Songs written by Steve Angello
Songs written by John Martin (singer)
Record Report Pop Rock General number-one singles
Synth-pop ballads
Pop ballads
English-language Swedish songs
Songs written by Michel Zitron
2012 songs